The Australian cricket team played 34 first-class matches in England in 1890, including two Test matches (a third Test was abandoned due to bad weather without play ever starting).

Test series summary
England won the Test series 2–0.

First Test

Second Test

Third Test

Ceylon
As in 1884, the Australians had stopovers in Colombo en route and on the return voyage they played a match at Galle Face Green against the Ceylon national team, though it was not a first-class fixture at that time. The match was drawn.

References

External links
 CricketArchive – tour summaries

Annual reviews
 James Lillywhite's Cricketers' Annual (Red Lilly) 1891
 Wisden Cricketers' Almanack 1891

Further reading
 Bill Frindall, The Wisden Book of Test Cricket 1877-1978, Wisden, 1979
 Chris Harte, A History of Australian Cricket, Andre Deutsch, 1993
 Ray Robinson, On Top Down Under, Cassell, 1975

1890 in Australian cricket
1890 in English cricket
1890 in Ceylon
International cricket competitions from 1888–89 to 1918
1890
1890
English cricket seasons in the 19th century
Sri Lankan cricket seasons from 1880–81 to 1971–72
1890